Taras Oleksandrovych Shelestyuk (born 30 November 1985) is a Ukrainian professional boxer signed with Banner Promotions. He is 16–0 with 10 knockouts as a professional and is trained by legendary boxing trainer Freddie Roach. Shelestyuk won the gold medal at Welterweight division at the 2011 World Amateur Boxing Championships in Baku and Bronze medal at Olympic games in London 2012.

Professional career
In the final of 2011 World Championships, he beat Serik Sapiyev from Kazakhstan after 3 rounds with 16–10 final score (5:2, 3:2, 8:6 per round). Prior to the final, beating his opponents from Denmark, Cuba, France and Russia respectively, he qualified for 2012 Summer Olympics by reaching the quarter finals. Along with his contribution, Ukraine Boxing National Team have topped the 2011 World Amateur Boxing Championship overall medal table with 4 gold and 1 silver medals. Additionally, climbing up 20 ladders, Shelestyuk captured the top spot at AIBA individual rankings with 1700 points, as of 31 October 2011, in front of Welsh Freddie Evans and Indian Vikas Krishan.
Getting the Bronze medal in Olympic Games in London 2012 he moved to Los Angeles and signed a contract with a promotion company and turned professional. Now training at famous boxing gym "Wild Card boxing club" with trainer Freddie Roach.

Highlights

Professional boxing record

| style="text-align:center;" colspan="8"|17 wins (10 knockouts), 0 losses, 0 draws
|- style="text-align:center; background:#e3e3e3;"
| style="border-style:none none solid solid; "|Res.
| style="border-style:none none solid solid; "|Record
| style="border-style:none none solid solid; "|Opponent
| style="border-style:none none solid solid; "|Type
| style="border-style:none none solid solid; "|Round
| style="border-style:none none solid solid; "|Date
| style="border-style:none none solid solid; "|Location
| style="border-style:none none solid solid; "|Notes
|- align=center
|Draw||19–0–1||align=left| Gabriel Maestre
|||
|
|align=left|
|align=left|
|- align=center
|Win||19–0||align=left| Ernesto Espana
|||
|
|align=left|
|align=left|
|- align=center
|Win||18–0||align=left| Luis Alberto Veron
|||
|
|align=left|
|align=left|
|- align=center
|Win||17–0||align=left| Martin Angel Martinez
|||
|
|align=left|
|align=left|
|- align=center
|Win||16–0||align=left| Jesus Alvarez Rodriguez
|||
|
|align=left|
|align=left|
|- align=center
|Win||15–0||align=left| Jaime Herrera
|||
|
|align=left|
|align=left|
|- align=center
|Win||14–0||align=left| Erick Daniel Martinez
|||
|
|align=left|
|align=left|
|- align=center
|Win||13–0||align=left| Aslanbek Kozaev
|||
|
|align=left|
|align=left|
|- align=center
|Win||12–0||align=left| Juan Rodriguez Jr
|||
|
|align=left|
|align=left|
|- align=center
|Win||11–0||align=left| Francisco Javier Reza
|||
|
|align=left|
|align=left|
|- align=center
|Win||10–0||align=left| Antonio Chaves Fernandez
|||
|
|align=left|
|align=left|
|- align=center
|Win||9–0||align=left| Patrick Boozer
|||
|
|align=left|
|align=left|
|- align=center
|Win||8–0||align=left| Romon Barber
|||
|
|align=left|
|align=left|
|- align=center
|Win||7–0||align=left| Francisco Flores
|||
|
|align=left|
|align=left|
|- align=center
|Win||6–0||align=left| Thomas Allen
|||
|
|align=left|
|align=left|
|- align=center
|Win||5–0||align=left| Adam Ealoms
|||
|
|align=left|
|align=left|
|- align=center
|Win||4–0||align=left| Travis Hanshaw
|||
|
|align=left|
|align=left|
|- align=center
|Win||3–0||align=left| Mario Angeles
|||
|
|align=left|
|align=left|
|- align=center
|Win||2–0||align=left| Brandon Adams
|||
|
|align=left|
|align=left|
|- align=center
|Win||1–0||align=left| Kamal Muhammad
|||
|
|align=left|
|align=left|

See also
 2011 World Amateur Boxing Championships
 2010 European Amateur Boxing Championships

References

External links
 
 Profile on AIBA
 2011 World Championships results on AIBA
 2011 World Championships results

1985 births
Sportspeople from Makiivka
Living people
Welterweight boxers
Boxers at the 2012 Summer Olympics
Olympic boxers of Ukraine
Olympic bronze medalists for Ukraine
Olympic medalists in boxing
Medalists at the 2012 Summer Olympics
Ukrainian male boxers
AIBA World Boxing Championships medalists
Hlukhiv National Pedagogical University of Oleksandr Dovzhenko alumni